Gerald Bruce Archibald (August 22, 1907 – November 25, 1990) was a Canadian professional basketball player and coach. He played for a number of semi-professional and independent league teams before appearing professionally in the National Basketball League (NBL). In the NBL, Archibald played for the Warren Penns and Cleveland White Horses where he averaged 0.6 points per game. During the 1937–38 and 1938–39 seasons he doubled as a player-coach for those teams, respectively. He also served as the Detroit Eagles' head coach in 1939–40.

Gerry Archibald was born in Charlottetown, Prince Edward Island. He was the son of Lyman Archibald, who was a member of James Naismith's first basketball team in Springfield, Massachusetts in 1891.

References

1907 births
1990 deaths
Canadian men's basketball players
Cleveland White Horses coaches
Cleveland White Horses players
Detroit Eagles coaches
Guards (basketball)
National Basketball League (United States) owners
Player-coaches
Sportspeople from Charlottetown
Warren Penns coaches
Warren Penns players
Canadian expatriates in the United States